Somi Nanda Ratnayake (born October 27, 1946, as සොමී රත්නායක) [Sinhala]), also known as Somi Ratnayake, is a Sri Lankan actor in Sri Lankan cinema, stage drama and television. A highly versatile actor with a career spanning more than four decades, Rathnayake is a multi-talented personnel also working as a script writer and film producer.

Acting career
He directed the stage drama Ran Salakunu.

Selected television serials
 Haye Pahara

Filmography
Rathnayake started his film career with 1975 film Amaraneeya Adare directed by Dayananda Jayawardane. Then he contributed to several critically acclaimed films such as Suddilage Kathawa,  Surabidena, Sathkampa, and Parawarthana.

As actor

As producer

As Script writer

Awards

See also
 Cinema of Sri Lanka

References

External links
 Mata Mathaka Vidihata with Somi Ratnayake & his wife
 The beauties and the beasts of our movies

Sri Lankan male film actors
Living people
1946 births